Scartichthys viridis is a species of combtooth blenny found in the southeast Pacific ocean, from Peru to Chile. Members of this species feed primarily off of plants (including benthic algae and weeds), phytoplankton, amphipods, and mollusks.  This species reaches a length of  SL.

References

viridis
Fish described in 1836